Algiers is a 1938 American drama film directed by John Cromwell and starring Charles Boyer, Sigrid Gurie, and Hedy Lamarr. Written by John Howard Lawson, the film is about a notorious French jewel thief hiding in the labyrinthine native quarter of Algiers known as the Casbah. Feeling imprisoned by his self-imposed exile, he is drawn out of hiding by a beautiful French tourist who reminds him of happier times in Paris. The Walter Wanger production was a remake of the successful 1937 French film Pépé le Moko, which derived its plot from the Henri La Barthe novel of the same name.

Algiers was a sensation because it was the first Hollywood film starring Hedy Lamarr, whose beauty became the main attraction for film audiences. The film is notable as one of the sources of inspiration to the screenwriters of the 1942 Warner Bros. film Casablanca, who wrote it with Hedy Lamarr in mind as the original female lead. Charles Boyer's depiction of Pepe le Moko inspired the Warner Bros. animated character Pepé Le Pew. In 1966, the film entered the public domain in the United States because the claimants did not renew its copyright registration in the 28th year after publication.

Plot
Pepe le Moko is a notorious thief, who, after his last great heist, escaped from France to Algeria. Since his escape, le Moko became a resident and leader of the immense Casbah, or "native quarter", of Algiers. French officials who arrive insisting on Pepe's capture are met with unfazed local detectives, led by Inspector Slimane, who are biding their time. Meanwhile, Pepe begins to feel increasingly trapped in his prison-like stronghold, a feeling which intensifies after meeting the beautiful Gaby, who is visiting from France. His love for Gaby soon arouses the jealousy of Ines, Pepe's Algerian mistress.

The song in this film is called C'est la Vie which means That's Life in French.

Cast

 Charles Boyer as Pepe le Moko
 Sigrid Gurie as Ines
 Hedy Lamarr as Gaby
 Joseph Calleia as Inspector Slimane
 Alan Hale as Grandpere
 Gene Lockhart as Regis
 Walter Kingsford as Chief Inspector Louvain
 Paul Harvey as Commissioner Janvier
 Stanley Fields as Carlos

 Johnny Downs as Pierrot
 Charles D. Brown as Max
 Robert Greig as Giraux
 Leonid Kinskey as L'Arbi
 Joan Woodbury as Aicha
 Nina Koshetz as Tania
 Claudia Dell as Marie
 Ben Hall as Gil
 Bert Roach as Bertier

Cast notes
 Austrian actress Hedy Lamarr made her American film debut in Algiers, although she was already known for her appearance in the 1933 Czech film Ecstasy, in which she appeared nude. Howard Dietz, the head of MGM's publicity department, quizzed her about this, and she admitted to having appeared nude. "Did you look good?", he asked. "Of course!" "Then it's all right", he said, "no damage has been done."

Production
Walter Wanger, the producer of Algiers, purchased the rights to the French film Pepe le Moko in order to remake it, and bought all prints of the film to prevent it from competing with his film in the U.S.  Wanger used most of the music from the French film in this remake as well as background sequences.

The first version of the script for Algiers was rejected by the Breen Office because the leading ladies were both portrayed as "kept women," and because of references to prostitution, the promiscuity of the lead character, and his suicide at the end of the film, which was directed to be changed to his being shot instead of killing himself.

Backgrounds and exteriors for the film were shot in Algiers by a photographer named Knechtel, who was based in London. These photographs were integrated into the film by cinematographer James Wong Howe.

United Artists had considered Ingrid Bergman, Dolores del Río, and Sylvia Sidney for the female lead, but, as Boyer tells it, he met Hedy Lamarr at a party and introduced her to Wanger as a possibility for his co-lead. Cromwell says about Lamarr that she could not act. "After you've been in the business for a time, you can tell easily enough right when you meet them. I could sense her inadequacy, Wanger could sense it, and I could see Boyer getting worried even before we started talking behind Hedy's back...Sometimes the word personality is interchangeable with presence although they aren't the same thing. But the principle applies, and Hedy also had no personality. How could they think she could become a second Garbo?...I'll take some credit for making her acting passable but can only share credit with Boyer fifty-fifty."

Boyer did not enjoy his work on Algiers. "An actor never likes to copy another's style," he said, "and here I was copying Jean Gabin, one of the best." Director Cromwell "would run a scene from the original and insist we do it exactly that way — terrible, a perfectly terrible way to work." Cromwell, however, said that Boyer "never appreciated how different his own Pepe was from Gabin's. Boyer showed something like genius to make it different. It was a triumph of nuance. The shots are the same, the dialogue has the same meaning, but Boyer's Pepe and Gabin's Pepe are two different fellows but in the same predicament."

Box office
The film earned a profit of $150,466.

Awards and honors

Academy Awards
 Best Actor (nomination) – Charles Boyer
 Best Supporting Actor (nomination) – Gene Lockhart
 Best Art Direction (nomination) – Alexander Toluboff
 Best Cinematography (nomination) – James Wong Howe

National Board of Review Awards
Joseph Calleia received the 1938 National Board of Review Award for his performance as Slimane.

Others
The film is recognized by American Film Institute in these lists:
 2002: AFI's 100 Years...100 Passions – Nominated

Adaptations and remakes

Radio
In the autumn of 1938, Hollywood Playhouse presented a radio adaptation of Algiers starring Charles Boyer.

Algiers was adapted for the October 8, 1939, presentation of the CBS Radio series The Campbell Playhouse. The hour-long adaptation starred Orson Welles and Paulette Goddard, with Ray Collins taking the role of Inspector Slimane.

The film was dramatized as an hour-long radio play on two broadcasts of Lux Radio Theatre. Charles Boyer and Hedy Lamarr reprised their roles in the broadcast July 7, 1941. Boyer starred with Loretta Young in the broadcast December 14, 1942.

Film
Algiers was remade in 1948 as Casbah, a musical produced by Universal Pictures, starring singer Tony Martin and Yvonne De Carlo.  The film was directed by John Berry.  A 1949 Italian parody titled Totò Le Moko featured the comedian Totò.

In popular culture
The 1938 film Algiers  was most Americans' introduction to the picturesque alleys and souks of the Casbah. It was also the inspiration for the 1942 film Casablanca, written specifically for Hedy Lamarr in the female lead role. MGM, however, refused to release Lamarr, so the role went to Ingrid Bergman.

Charles Boyer's invitation to "Come with me to ze Casbah," did not appear in the film, but still became comedians' standard imitation of Boyer, much like "Play it again, Sam" for Humphrey Bogart, "Judy, Judy, Judy" for Cary Grant and "You dirty rat" for James Cagney– all apocryphal lines.  Boyer hated being reduced in that way, believing that it demeaned him as an actor. In some part, the lampoon of Boyer spread, owing to its use by Looney Tunes cartoon character Pepé Le Pew, a spoof of Boyer as Pépé le Moko. The amorous skunk used "Come with me to ze Casbah" as a pickup line. In 1954, the Looney Tunes cartoon The Cat's Bah, which specifically spoofed Algiers, the skunk enthusiastically declared to Penelope Pussycat "You do not have to come with me to ze Casbah. We are already here!"

Parts of the dialog between Charles Boyer and Hedy Lamarr have been sampled by new wave band The New Occupants for their song Electric Angel.

See also
 Casbah (1946)
 The Battle of Algiers (1966)
 List of American films of 1938
 List of films in the public domain in the United States

References

External links

 
 
 
 
 

1938 films
Films directed by John Cromwell
1930s English-language films
1938 romantic drama films
American gangster films
American black-and-white films
American remakes of French films
Films set in Algiers
Films shot in Algeria
United Artists films
American romantic drama films
Films produced by Walter Wanger
Articles containing video clips
1930s American films